Greya enchrysa is a moth of the  family Prodoxidae. It is found in open, grassy pine forests in the drier interior regions of southern British Columbia, Alberta, Washington, Oregon, Idaho and western Montana.

The wingspan is 15.5–20 mm. The forewings are mostly uniformly pale ochreous, often with a golden lustre. The hindwings are darker and grey.

The larvae feed on Heuchera cylindrica and Heuchera grossulariifolia. They initially live in a capsule of their host plant, feeding on the seeds.

References

Moths described in 1992
Prodoxidae
Taxa named by Donald R. Davis (entomologist)